Dahl's jird (Meriones dahli)  is a species of rodent in the family Muridae. It is found only in Armenia and the neighboring Agri province of Turkey.

References

 Bulut, S. 2009.  Dahl's Jird/Meriones dahli.   Turkey's Mammals.   Downloaded on 3 October 2010.

Meriones (rodent)
Mammals described in 1962
Taxonomy articles created by Polbot